Murad Bey Mohammed ( 1750 – 22 April 1801) was an Egyptian Mamluk chieftain (Bey), cavalry commander and joint ruler of Egypt with Ibrahim Bey. He is often remembered as being a cruel and extortionate ruler, but an energetic courageous fighter.

The title given to him, "Bey", denotes an aristocratic status broadly indicative of "Lordship", subject to the cultural norms of the Ottoman Empire. More specifically, the cultural norms of the Egyptian province in the Ottoman Empire, since Egypt enjoyed varying degrees of autonomy throughout the Ottoman period.

Biography

While many Georgian and foreign historians claim Murad was of Georgian origin and born in Tiflis, several others believe he was a Circassian. In 1768 he was sold to the (Circassian) Mamluk Muhammad Bey Abu al-Dhahab in Egypt.

After the death of his master Muhammad Bey Abu al-Dhahab, Murad Bey was in command of the Mamluk army, whereas Ibrahim Bey was in charge of administrative duties of Egypt. They survived through the persistent Ottoman attempts at overthrowing the Mamluk regime and civil strifes. They served as kaymakams (acting governors) in Egypt on occasion, although they effectively held de facto power for decades, even over the appointed Ottoman governor of Egypt.

In 1786, the Ottoman sultan Abdülhamid I sent Kapudan Pasha (grand admiral of the Ottoman Navy) Cezayirli Gazi Hasan Pasha to drive out Ibrahim and Murad Bey. Hasan Pasha was fervent and thorough in his efforts and succeeded in the short term, reestablishing direct Ottoman Empire control over Egypt. Ismail Bey was appointed as new Mamluk leader and Shaykh al-Balad (civil governor and de facto ruler). However, in 1791, only five years after their expulsion by Hasan Pasha, the duumvirate returned to Cairo from hiding in southern Egypt and took back de facto control. At this time, Murad Bey served as Amir al-Hajj (Commander of the Hajj).

He commanded the Mamluk cavalry and Janissaries' infantry in the Battle of Shubra Khit on 13 July 1798, but he was defeated by the French Armée and withdrew from the fight. Eight days later, on 21 July, he commanded the Mamluk cavalry during the Battle of the Pyramids, alongside Ibrahim Bey, and was defeated at the hands of Napoleon's armies. While Ibrahim Bey fled towards Sinai, Murad had fled to Cairo first and then to Upper Egypt and began mounting a brief guerrilla campaign that staved off Desaix for a year. It was while pursuing Murad Bey into Upper Egypt that the French discovered the monuments at Dendera, Thebes, Edfu and Philae.

Murad had reportedly offered money to the French forces to leave Egypt and offered to ally himself with the British in exchange for allowing the British to occupy Alexandria, Damietta and Rosetta. In 1800, Murad made peace with Jean Baptiste Kléber, and agreed to garrison Cairo. He was responsible for collecting taxes from upper Egypt on behalf of the French republic. He was part of the French army at the Battle of Heliopolis, commanding his Mamluks on the French right wing, but he deserted the French army before the battle and did not participate in the fighting. After the French army was defeated at Canopus by a British army under Abercomby, the French governor of Cairo Augustin-Daniel Belliard ordered Murad Bey to assist him in defending the capital. Murad set out to assist the governor, but died on his way of Bubonic plague.

See also

 Ibrahim Bey (Mamluk), his career-long partner in ruling Egypt
 Nafisa al-Bayda, his wife who served as his go-between during the French occupation

References

1750 births
1801 deaths
18th-century Ottoman governors of Egypt
19th-century Egyptian people
Egyptian military personnel
19th-century deaths from plague (disease)
Mamluks
Egyptian nobility
Political people from the Ottoman Empire
Ottoman military leaders of the French Revolutionary Wars
Ottoman governors of Egypt
Georgians from the Ottoman Empire